The Tashkent–Samarkand high-speed rail line is a  high-speed rail connection between Tashkent and Samarkand, the two largest Uzbekistan cities. The route passes through four regions: Tashkent, Sirdaryo, Jizzakh and Samarqand in Uzbekistan. Trains operate seven days a week under the brand Afrosiyob. An extension to Bukhara on the Talgo 250 ran for the first time on 25 August 2016 – marking the completion of a project to modernise the  route from Samarkand.

History

Construction began on the line on 11 March 2011, with completion planned for later that year at a cost of approximately US$70 million. The line includes both new and rebuilt trackage, as well as adding modern signaling systems to the route. In addition to building trackage capable of supporting high-speed service, some track of lower standards was built to the cities of Bukhara and Khiva as part of the project. The line was planned to open for commercial operation in September 2011, but suffered from delays.

Operation

Two trainsets for operation on the line were ordered in November 2009 from Talgo at a cost of €38 million The cost of the purchase was split between operator O'zbekiston Temir Yo'llari and a loan from the state Fund for Reconstruction and Development of Uzbekistan. The first trainset, a Talgo 250, was delivered to Tashkent on 22 July 2011. Each trainset consists of two power cars and eight passenger cars with a capacity of 257 people and a dining car. The second trainset arrived in Tashkent on 9 December 2011.
The train carried out its first trip from Tashkent to Samarkand on 26 August 2011.

Two more Talgo 250 trainsets were constructed for Afrosiyob services in 2017.

Commercial service started on 8 October 2011 twice a week under the brand Afrosiyob. Initially, total travel time was still more than two and half-hours but services were upgraded to five times a week in January 2012, and daily services started from 13 February 2012. The travel time has been reduced to 2:08 hours as of 10 February 2013.

Further extensions 
The high-speed rail line is expected to be extended until Khiva by Urgench in order to complete the Uzbek silk road. A new station has opened in December 2018 in Khiva and was connected with a  railroad to Urgench. The connection between Bukhara and Urgench is expected to be completed in 2021. In February 2022, works on the line between Bukhara and Urgench are still in progress. At its completion, travel between Tashkent and Khiva should take 7 hours.

Routes
Routes as of 31 August 2019:
Tashkent–Samarqand–Navoiy–Bukhara
Tashkent–Samarqand–Karshi

References

External links

Uzbekistan Railways

High-speed railway lines in Uzbekistan
Railway lines in Uzbekistan
Railway lines opened in 2011
2011 establishments in Uzbekistan